Yume Hirano (平野優芽, born 15 March 2000) is a Japanese rugby sevens player. She competed in the women's tournament at the 2020 Summer Olympics. She captained Japan at the 2022 Rugby World Cup Sevens in Cape Town.

References

External links
 

2000 births
Living people
Female rugby sevens players
Olympic rugby sevens players of Japan
Rugby sevens players at the 2020 Summer Olympics
Sportspeople from Tokyo
Asian Games medalists in rugby union
Rugby union players at the 2018 Asian Games
Medalists at the 2018 Asian Games
Asian Games gold medalists for Japan
Japan international women's rugby sevens players
Universiade medalists in rugby sevens
Universiade gold medalists for Japan
Medalists at the 2019 Summer Universiade
21st-century Japanese women